"I Know You Want Me" was the first single from Young Buck's second album, Buck the World. It was released in November 2006 and was produced by and features Jazze Pha.

Music video
There were many cameos, including 50 Cent, Tony Yayo, M.O.P, Mobb Deep, Lloyd Banks, Brisco, Rick Ross, Yung Joc, P. Diddy, Jeezy, Ludacris, Spider Loc, LoLa Monroe and others.

Charts

References

External links 
 

2006 songs
2006 singles
Young Buck songs
Song recordings produced by Jazze Pha
Interscope Records singles
Songs written by Young Buck
G-Unit Records singles
Songs written by Jazze Pha